Josef Zeman (24 December 1925 – 16 June 2003) was a Czech wrestler. He competed in the men's Greco-Roman flyweight at the 1952 Summer Olympics.

References

External links
 

1925 births
2003 deaths
Czech male sport wrestlers
Olympic wrestlers of Czechoslovakia
Wrestlers at the 1952 Summer Olympics
Place of birth missing